Proteuxoa passalota is a moth of the family Noctuidae. It is found in New South Wales, South Australia, Victoria and Western Australia.

External links
Australian Faunal Directory

Proteuxoa
Moths of Australia
Moths described in 1909